"Two to Go" is the 21st episode of season 6 of the television show Buffy the Vampire Slayer. The name of the episode is a reference to the previous one, which ends with Willow saying "One down" after killing Warren. Despite the death of Tara Maclay, she remains in brief scenes that are part of the opening credits.

This episode, and its second part, "Grave", were shown, back-to-back, as a two-hour feature on its original airing in both the United States and UK – consequently, the presentation of this episode on DVD includes credits such as "Grave" Written by...

Joss Whedon wanted to keep Anthony Stewart Head's appearance in this episode a surprise, and thus left him off of the main cast list; Head is listed as a 'special guest' in the closing credits. Whedon also does this in Angel for Julie Benz in "To Shanshu in L.A.", Eliza Dushku in "Judgment", Juliet Landau in "The Trial" and Alyson Hannigan in "There's No Place Like Plrtz Glrb".

Plot
While Spike continues to pass trials in his quest in Africa, Buffy, Xander, and Anya try to pursue Willow, who has killed Warren to avenge his murder of Tara and now plans to execute his two jailed accomplices. They discover that Willow has damaged Xander's car to prevent them from catching her. Buffy continues her pursuit on foot.

Anya teleports into Jonathan and Andrew's cell shortly before Willow arrives. Anya and Buffy manage to evade Willow's attack and slip away with the two men. As Xander drives them away in a stolen police cruiser, Willow attacks them with a truck she is wielding magically; but her overuse of magic has drained her power, and they escape.

Dawn and Clem decide to go to the dark magician Rack's lair, expecting Willow to try to deal with him to recharge her powers. Buffy, Xander and Anya regroup at the Magic Box and debate their course of action. Buffy believes she can convince Willow to relent, but the others disagree; Buffy heads for Rack's, alone. Xander admits to Anya that he might have been able to stop Warren before he fired on Buffy and Tara, but was afraid to intervene, unarmed.

Willow meets with Rack, who attempts to seduce her. She rejects his advances, drains his power and kills him, just as Dawn arrives. Dawn's effort to calm the much more powerful Willow prove futile and serve only to annoy her, but Buffy arrives before she acts against Dawn. Buffy tries to talk with Willow, who replies that nothing in the world matters anymore since Tara's death. Willow teleports the group back to the Magic Shop, where Buffy and Dawn collapse. As Willow attacks, Anya fires up a protection spell to shield Jonathan and Andrew. As Willow intensifies her attack, Buffy tries a physical attack, allowing all but Anya to escape.

Willow subdues Buffy, then disables Anya and negates her protection spells. As she declares her victory, she is struck down by a bolt of energy from an arriving Giles.

References

External links

 

Buffy the Vampire Slayer (season 6) episodes
2002 American television episodes
Television episodes about revenge